Mount Richthofen is the highest summit of the Never Summer Mountains range of the Rocky Mountains of North America. The mountain was named in honor of pioneering German geologist Baron Ferdinand von Richthofen, apparently by Clarence King's 1870 survey team.

Mountain
Needles and Grenadiers explorer William S. Cooper climbed Mount Richthofen by himself in 1908 in what is presumed to be the first ascent in historic times by Americans of European descent. No sign of previous climbers were present at that time.

Today, the mountain is typically climbed from Lake Agnes to the north, easily reachable from Cameron Pass. The mountain is a steep Class 3 climb that often requires travel on steep scree slopes that are not very stable.

See also

 List of Colorado mountain ranges
 List of Colorado mountain summits
 List of Colorado fourteeners
 List of Colorado 4000 meter prominent summits
 List of the most prominent summits of Colorado
 List of Colorado county high points

References

External links

 SummitPost.org

Mountains of Rocky Mountain National Park
Mountains of Grand County, Colorado
Mountains of Jackson County, Colorado
North American 3000 m summits
Great Divide of North America